The Kotagama inscription found in Kegalle District in Sri Lanka is a record of victory left by the Aryacakravarti kings of the Jaffna Kingdom in western Sri Lanka. The inscription reads;

Some historians attribute the inscriptions to Martanda Cinkaiariyan (died 1348) whereas others date it to the 15th century based on language usage. The inscription is written in Tamil script.

See also 
 Annaicoddai seal
 Tissamaharama Tamil Brahmi inscription

Notes

References

Jaffna kingdom
Tamil inscriptions in Sri Lanka
Sri Lanka inscriptions